Radio Globo may refer to

Rádio Globo, a Brazilian news radio network
Radio Globo (Honduras), radio station operating in Tegucigalpa, Honduras
Radio Globo (Italy), Italian station based in Rome

See also
Grupo Globo, South American large mass media group founded in Rio de Janeiro, Brazil and with a big number of radio stations and other investments
Globo (disambiguation)